East Varick is a hamlet in the Town of Varick, Seneca County, New York, United States, along Cayuga Lake. It is located four miles (6 km) east of the hamlet of Romulus, at an elevation of 400 feet (122 m). The primary intersection within the vicinity of the hamlet is at N.Y. Route 89 and Ernsberger Road (CR 128).

References

Hamlets in Seneca County, New York
Hamlets in New York (state)
Populated places in Seneca County, New York